Melrose Family Fashions  is a chain of clothing stores in the Southwestern United States operated by United Fashions of Texas Ltd.

Melrose was started in 1976 with one store in McAllen, Texas, by the Bar-Yadin family, immigrants from Israel.

This single store specialized in fashion for "Juniors", but grew over the years into a chain that included a Plus size department as well as a Contemporary Misses department.

There are over one hundred stores throughout Texas, New Mexico, Arizona, Nevada and California. In recent years Melrose has added departments for men and kids fashions, electronics, home goods and expanded cosmetics departments.

References

External links
melrosestore.com

1976 establishments in Texas
Companies based in Texas